Fred Åkerström sjunger Ruben Nilson (English: Fred Åkerström sings Ruben Nilson)  is a debut studio album by Swedish folk singer-songwriter and guitar player Fred Åkerström. On the album, Åkerström interprets songs of Swedish folk author Ruben Nilson.

Track listing
 Trubaduren (03:01)
 Duett i Småland (02:41)
 Åkare Lundgrens begravning (03:39)
 Förstadsromantik (03:15)
 Ficktjyvens visa (02:57)
 Fimpen och tändstickan (03:08)
 Bergsprängardramatik (03:32)
 Den odödliga hästen (03:13)
 Amerikabrevet (02:14)
 Laban och hans döttrar (02:35)

Swedish-language albums
1963 debut albums
Fred Åkerström albums